"Notgonnachange" is a by British pop group Swing Out Sister. It was released as the follow-up single to "Am I the Same Girl". It reached number 49 on the UK Singles Chart and number 22 on the U.S. Billboard adult contemporary chart. This song was subsequently remixed by Frankie Knuckles, and the dance mix of "Notgonnachange" peaked at number 21 on the U.S. Hot Dance Club Play chart during the summer of 1992.

In line with the album theme, Corinne Drewery also grew out her hair from her trademark bob which had become a visual signature for their early years.

Remixes

Notgonnachange (CD Mini) PHDR-111
"Notgonnachange" (Album Version) - (4:55)   (Taken from the album "Get in Touch with Yourself") 
"Am I The Same Girl" (Bubba's Version) - (4:09)

Notgonnachange (CD Maxi) SWICD 10
"Notgonnachange" (O' Duffy 7" Mix) - (4:19)  (Available on the album "Best of Swing Out Sister") 
"Notgonnachange" (Dashi 1 Mix) - (8:10)
"Alone" - (11:55)

Notgonnachange (CD Maxi) 866 855-2
"Notgonnachange" (Album Version) - (4:55)   (Taken from the album "Get in Touch with Yourself") 
"Notgonnachange" (Classic Song Mix) - (5:35)
"Notgonnachange" (O' Duffy 7" Mix) - (4:19)
"Notgonnachange" (New Jack Swing Mix) - (5:08)
"Notgonnachange" (O' Duffy 12" Mix) - (8:09)

Notgonnachange (The Frankie Knuckles Remixes) 864 049-1, SWING 1012 Vinyl 12"
"Notgonnachange" (Classic Club Mix) - (7:23)
"Notgonnachange" (Classic Song Mix) - (5:35)
"Notgonnachange" (Mix Of Drama) - (6:45)   
"Notgonnachange" (Dashi 1 Mix) - (8:10)

References

1992 singles
Swing Out Sister songs
Songs written by Andy Connell
Songs written by Corinne Drewery
1992 songs
Fontana Records singles